New York at Night may refer to:

New York at Night, a 2020 album by Willie Nile
New York at Night, TV series with Clint Holmes
"New York at Night", song by Old Dominion from Happy Endings 
"New York at Night", song by Aaron Hedenstrom by the One O'Clock Lab Band 
"New York at Night", song by Kelly Marie from Feels Like I'm in Love